is a 1997 Japanese film directed by Jun Ichikawa.

Plot

Cast
Kyōzō Nagatsuka as Koichi Hamanaka
Kaori Momoi as Tami Ohsawa 
Mitsuko Baisho as Hisako Hamanaka 
Satoko Abe as Tomomi Ito 
Kyoko Asagiri as Tami's step mother 
Tokue Hanazawa as Asakura's father 
Koba Hayashi as Hamanaka's father 
Takaya Kamikawa as Sadaji Asakawa 
Reiko Nanao as Hamanaka's mother 
Akira Oizumi as Tomomi's father

Awards and nominations
22nd Hochi Film Award 
 Won: Best Supporting Actress - Mitsuko Baisho

40th Blue Ribbon Awards
 Won: Best Actress - Kaori Momoi 
 Won: Best Supporting Actress - Mitsuko Baisho

Kinema Junpo Awards
 Won: Best Actress - Kaori Momoi 
 Won: Best Supporting Actress - Mitsuko Baisho

Mainichi Film Awards
 Won: Best Actress - Kaori Momoi 
 Won: Best Supporting Actress - Mitsuko Baisho

References

External links

1997 films
Films directed by Jun Ichikawa
1990s Japanese-language films
1990s Japanese films